Stillking Films is a production company based in the Czech Republic.

Stillking Films is the biggest production company in the Czech Republic.

History
Stillking was founded by Matthew Stillman in 1993. The company initially produced music videos and TV commercials. The company co-produced its first full-length film in 1995. In the years that followed, the production of feature films became an increasingly important part of the company’s business. The company has also grown, with subsidiaries established in the United Kingdom, South Africa, Spain, Hungary, Romania and Chile.

Offices
 Stillking Films Barrandov Film Studios - Prague
 Stillking Cape Town Radio House - Cape Town
 Motel Productions - Barcelona
 Stillking London - London
 Stillking Santiago De Chile - Santiago De Chile
 Stillking USA - Los Angeles
 Pioneer Stillking Films - Budapest
 Icon Films - Bucharest

Works

Film and television

References

External links
 

Film production companies of the Czech Republic
Mass media companies established in 1993
Companies based in Prague
Television production companies of the Czech Republic